Rakta Yamari (Tibetan shin je she mar in, Wylie: gshin rje gshed dmar "the Red Enemy of Death") is a Tantric Buddhist meditational deity which is a wrathful form of bodhisattva Manjushri or Yamantaka. Yamari deities have two forms: red (rakta) and black (krishna), and are part of the Anuttarayoga Class of Tantric Buddhism.
The Ngor Mandala collection of the Sakya tradition alone lists eight different forms/lineages of the blue/black buffalo-faced Vajrabhairava (which include the two Gelug ones) and four of red Rakta- or blue Krishna-Yamari (all without the buffalo head). All the former are yidams (meditational deities) whereas Yamaraja (sometimes also called Dharamaraja) is a Dharma protector.
Rakta Yamari of Virupa and Rakta Yamari of Shridhara appear in chapter 8 of The Collection of All Tantras, compiled by Jamyang Khyentse Wangpo and Jamyang Loter Wangpo.

References

External links 

Buddhist tantras
Herukas
Tibetan Buddhist deities